Iceworld Boondall is an ice sports and public ice skating centre, located approximately 20 km north of Brisbane, Queensland. It hosts a number of major ice hockey games, including Australian Women's Ice Hockey League games. The venue offers a wide variety of activities including ice skating lessons, birthday parties, figure skating, speed skating, curling, synchronised skating, public skating sessions, and it is also the home venue of the Brisbane Goannas. The venue has been operating in Brisbane for over 30 years. Iceworld Boondall is also a host venue for the Duke Trophy, an annual inter-state short track speed skating competition in Australia.

See also

List of ice rinks in Australia
Australian Women's Ice Hockey League
Duke Trophy

References

Figure skating venues in Australia
Ice hockey venues in Australia
Speed skating venues in Australia
Sports venues in Brisbane
Tourist attractions in Brisbane
2001 establishments in Australia
Multi-purpose stadiums in Australia
Sports venues completed in 2001
Indoor arenas in Australia
Boondall, Queensland